Francisco Pantaleón Luna (c. 1770–1814) was an Argentine military man and politician, who served as Lieutenant Governor and Commander of Arms of La Rioja Province. He had an active political participation during the end of the colonial period and also in the beginnings of Argentine independence.

Biography 
He was born in La Rioja province, Argentina, the son of Juan Francisco de Luna Carmona and María Juana Ortiz de Ocampo, belonging to a distinguished Creole family. He did his elementary studies in his home province to later enlist in the army.

He possibly participated in the military actions of defense and reconquest of Buenos Aires during the English Invasions, and supported the cause of the 
May Revolution of 1810. He also had an outstanding political performance in his native province, being military chief and lieutenant governor until 1814. Later he was appointed by Gervasio Posadas to occupy the government of Catamarca Province, without being able to assume the position by a serious illness. 

Francisco Pantaleón Luna was married to Francisca de Borja Zavaleta, parents of Carmen Luna y Borja Zavaleta, who was married on 25 May 1832 in Buenos Aires with José María Canaveris Denis, son of José Canaveris and Agustina Denis, belonging to a patrician family of the city.

References

External links 
Bautismos 1740–1800, 1806–1834

1770s births
1814 deaths
Argentine Army officers
Politicians from Buenos Aires
Argentine people of Spanish descent
People from La Rioja Province, Argentina
Spanish colonial governors and administrators